Egmont National Park is located south of New Plymouth, close to the west coast of the North Island of New Zealand. The park covers Mount Taranaki and its slopes. The park was first created in 1881 as a forest reserve and went on to become New Zealand’s second national park in 1900. 

The forest reserve was created within a 6-mile (9.6-kilometre) radius around the cone of the dormant volcano. Areas encompassing the older volcanic remnants of Pouakai and Kaitake were later added to the reserve at the northwest side. The forest is surrounded on all sides by pasture, giving it a distinctly circular shape.

Ecology
The park receives massive annual rainfall. Moist westerlies from the Tasman Sea form Orographic precipitation when they reach Mount Taranaki and the adjacent Pouakai and Kaitake ranges. Since the area has high annual rainfall and a mild coastal climate there is a lush rainforest covering the foothills, a forest that is nationally significant for the total absence of beech trees (genus Nothofagus).

A rich northern rata/rimu/broadleaf forest is present, although the entire park ecosystem displays distinct patterns of altitudinal zonation – the former two large species of tree are common at lower elevations whereas kamahi tends to dominate the stunted high elevation forest. In these old growth forests the crown fern (Blechnum discolor) is a dominant understory plant species.

The character of the plant communities continues to change with increasing elevation, to subalpine and alpine shrublands at high elevations, which are in stark contrast to the surrounding pasture farmlands. Notable among the geographical features of the park is its clear radial drainage pattern, which can be discerned in the satellite picture at right.

The Ahukawakawa Swamp is a rare high-elevation (920 m) sphagnum moss wetland located between Mount Taranaki and the Pouakai Range. It contains many endemic species adapted to acid soils and low temperatures.

The park was declared free of feral goats in 2022, the first national park in New Zealand to be free of ungulates, as it was already free of feral pigs and deer. Pest animals present include possums, rodents, hares, stoats, weasels and ferrets.

Gallery

See also
National parks of New Zealand
Forest parks of New Zealand
Regional parks of New Zealand
Protected areas of New Zealand
Conservation in New Zealand

References

External links

 Department of Conservation information on Egmont National Park

National parks of New Zealand
Protected areas of Taranaki
Protected areas established in 1900